The 2018 French Open was a major tennis tournament played on outdoor clay courts. It took place at the Stade Roland Garros in Paris, France, from 27 May to 10 June and consisted of events for players in singles, doubles and mixed doubles play. Junior and wheelchair players also took part in singles and doubles events. Rafael Nadal (Spain) was the defending champion in the Men's Singles and won his 11th French Open title. Simona Halep (Romania) won her first Grand Slam title in Women's Singles.

It was the 122nd edition of the French Open and the second Grand Slam event of 2018. Jeļena Ostapenko was the defending champion in the Women's Singles but lost in the first round to Kateryna Kozlova. This was the first French Open since 1992 that both the men's and the women's singles competitions were won by the top seeds.

Tournament

The 2018 French Open was the 122nd edition of the French Open and was held at Stade Roland Garros in Paris. A new shot clock that gives 25 seconds for the player serving, between points was introduced. Also for the juniors tournament, service lets wasn't featured.

The tournament is an event run by the International Tennis Federation (ITF) and is part of the 2018 ATP World Tour and the 2018 WTA Tour calendars under the Grand Slam category. The tournament consisted of both men's and women's singles and doubles draws as well as a mixed doubles event.

There is a singles and doubles events for both boys and girls (players under 18), which is part of the Grade A category of tournaments, and singles and doubles events for men's and women's wheelchair tennis players under the Grand Slam category. The tournament was played on clay courts and took place over a series of 22 courts, including the three main showcourts, Court Philippe Chatrier, Court Suzanne Lenglen and Court 1.

Points and prize money

Points distribution
Below is a series of tables for each of the competitions showing the ranking points on offer for each event.

Senior points

Wheelchair points

Junior points

Prize money
The total prize money for the 2018 edition is €39,197,000. The winners of the men's and women's singles title receive €2,200,000, an increase of €100,000 compared to 2017.

* per team

Singles players 
2018 French Open – Men's singles

2018 French Open – Women's singles

Day-by-day summaries

Singles seeds

The following are the seeded players and notable players who have withdrawn from the event. Seedings are based on ATP and WTA rankings as of 21 May 2018. Rank and points before are as of 28 May 2018.

Men's singles

Withdrawn players 

† The player did not qualify for the tournament in 2017. Accordingly, this was the points defended from the 2017 ATP Challenger Tour.

Women's singles

† The player did not qualify for the tournament in 2017. Accordingly, points for her 16th best result are deducted instead.

Withdrawn players

Doubles seeds

Men's doubles

1 Rankings are as of 21 May 2018.

Women's doubles

 1 Rankings are as of 21 May 2018.

Mixed doubles

 1 Rankings are as of 28 May 2018.

Main draw wildcard entries
The following players were given wildcards (wc) to the main draw based on internal selection and recent performances.

Men's singles 
  Grégoire Barrère
  Elliot Benchetrit
  Alex de Minaur
  Calvin Hemery
  Maxime Janvier
  Nicolas Mahut
  Corentin Moutet
  Noah Rubin

Women's singles 
  Fiona Ferro
  Myrtille Georges
  Amandine Hesse
  Chloé Paquet
  Pauline Parmentier
  Jessika Ponchet
  Taylor Townsend
  Isabelle Wallace

Men's doubles 
 Geoffrey Blancaneaux /  Constant Lestienne
 Benjamin Bonzi /  Grégoire Jacq
 Jérémy Chardy /  Daniel Nestor
 Corentin Denolly /  Alexandre Müller
 Hugo Gaston /  Clément Tabur
 Antoine Hoang /  Ugo Humbert
 Florian Lakat /  Arthur Rinderknech

Women's doubles 
 Tessah Andrianjafitrimo /  Fiona Ferro
 Manon Arcangioli /  Shérazad Reix
 Clara Burel /  Diane Parry
 Sara Cakarevic /  Jessika Ponchet
 Amandine Hesse /  Pauline Parmentier
 Virginie Razzano /  Jade Suvrijn
 Serena Williams /  Venus Williams

Mixed doubles
 Tessah Andrianjafitrimo /  Ugo Humbert
 Sara Cakarevic /  Alexandre Müller
 Fiona Ferro /  Evan Furness
 Kristina Mladenovic /  Alexis Musialek
 Chloé Paquet /  Benoît Paire
 Pauline Parmentier /  Grégoire Barrère

Main draw qualifiers

Men's singles

  Adam Pavlásek
  Ilya Ivashka 
  Thomaz Bellucci
  Ernests Gulbis 
  Casper Ruud
  Rogério Dutra Silva
  Denis Kudla 
  Santiago Giraldo
  Guido Andreozzi
  Martin Kližan
  Jaume Munar
  Bernard Tomic
  Elias Ymer 
  Jozef Kovalík 
  Hubert Hurkacz 
  Carlos Taberner

Lucky losers
  Sergiy Stakhovsky
  Peter Polansky 
  Jürgen Zopp 
  Oscar Otte
  Simone Bolelli
  Ruben Bemelmans
  Mohamed Safwat
  Marco Trungelliti

Women's singles

  Richèl Hogenkamp 
  Rebecca Peterson 
  Deborah Chiesa
  Caroline Dolehide
  Magdalena Fręch 
  Viktorija Golubic 
  Mariana Duque Mariño 
  Barbora Krejčíková 
  Georgina García Pérez 
  Francesca Schiavone
  Grace Min
  Alexandra Dulgheru

Lucky losers
  Arantxa Rus
  Dalila Jakupović

Protected ranking
The following players were accepted directly into the main draw using a protected ranking:

 Men's singles
  Pablo Andújar (PR 105)
  James Duckworth (PR 105)
  Andreas Haider-Maurer (PR 63)
  Yoshihito Nishioka (PR 66)

 Women's singles
  Victoria Azarenka (PR 6)
  Vania King (PR 103)
  Kristína Kučová (PR 95)
  Bethanie Mattek-Sands (PR 90)
  Mandy Minella (PR 104)
  Serena Williams (PR 1)
  Zheng Saisai (PR 88)

Withdrawals
The following players were accepted directly into the main draw, but withdrew with injuries or other reasons.

 Men's singles
Before the tournament
  Chung Hyeon → replaced by  Sergiy Stakhovsky
  Steve Darcis → replaced by  Matteo Berrettini
  Alexandr Dolgopolov → replaced by  Simone Bolelli
  Roger Federer → replaced by  Laslo Đere
  Nicolás Kicker → replaced by  Oscar Otte
  Filip Krajinović → replaced by  Jürgen Zopp
  Nick Kyrgios → replaced by  Marco Trungelliti
  Lu Yen-hsun → replaced by  Ruben Bemelmans
  Andy Murray → replaced by  Cameron Norrie
  Milos Raonic → replaced by  James Duckworth
  Andrey Rublev → replaced by  Peter Polansky
  Cedrik-Marcel Stebe → replaced by  Thomas Fabbiano
  Viktor Troicki → replaced by  Mohamed Safwat
  Jo-Wilfried Tsonga → replaced by  Pablo Andújar

 Women's singles
Before the tournament
  Timea Bacsinszky → replaced by  Dalila Jakupović
  Catherine Bellis → replaced by  Viktória Kužmová
  Beatriz Haddad Maia → replaced by  Yanina Wickmayer
  Monica Niculescu → replaced by  Arantxa Rus
  Monica Puig → replaced by  Duan Yingying
  Agnieszka Radwańska → replaced by  Mandy Minella

During the tournament
  Serena Williams

Retirements

 Men's singles
  Marcos Baghdatis
  Peter Gojowczyk

 Women's singles
  Lesia Tsurenko

Champions

Seniors

Men's singles

  Rafael Nadal  def.  Dominic Thiem, 6–4, 6–3, 6–2

Women's singles

  Simona Halep  def.  Sloane Stephens, 3–6, 6–4, 6–1

Men's doubles

  Pierre-Hugues Herbert /  Nicolas Mahut def.  Oliver Marach /  Mate Pavić, 6–2, 7–6(7–4)

Women's doubles

  Barbora Krejčíková /  Kateřina Siniaková def.  Eri Hozumi /  Makoto Ninomiya, 6–3, 6–3

Mixed doubles

 Latisha Chan /  Ivan Dodig def.  Gabriela Dabrowski /  Mate Pavić, 6–1, 6–7(5–7), [10–8]

Juniors

Boys' singles

  Tseng Chun-hsin def.  Sebastián Báez, 7–6(7–5), 6–2

Girls' singles

  Coco Gauff def.  Caty McNally, 1–6, 6–3, 7–6(7–1)

Boys' doubles

  Ondřej Štyler /  Naoki Tajima def.  Ray Ho /  Tseng Chun-hsin, 6–4, 6–4

Girls' doubles

  Caty McNally  /  Iga Świątek def.  Yuki Naito  /  Naho Sato, 6–2, 7–5

Wheelchair events

Wheelchair men's singles

  Shingo Kunieda def.  Gustavo Fernández, 7–6(7–5), 6–0

Wheelchair women's singles

  Yui Kamiji def.  Diede de Groot, 2–6, 6–0, 6–2

Wheelchair men's doubles

  Stéphane Houdet /  Nicolas Peifer def.  Frédéric Cattanéo /  Stefan Olsson, 6–1, 7–6(7–5)

Wheelchair women's doubles

  Diede de Groot /  Aniek van Koot def.  Marjolein Buis /  Yui Kamiji, 6–1, 6–3

Other events

Legends under 45 doubles

  Àlex Corretja /  Juan Carlos Ferrero def.  Yevgeny Kafelnikov /  Marat Safin, 6–3, 6–3

Legends over 45 doubles

  Mansour Bahrami /  Fabrice Santoro def.  John McEnroe /  Cédric Pioline, 6–1, 2–6, [12–10]

Women's legends doubles

  Nathalie Dechy /  Amélie Mauresmo def.  Kim Clijsters /  Nathalie Tauziat, 6–7(4–7), 6–4, [15–13]

References

External links

 Roland Garros